Thomas Batchelor may refer to:

Thomas Batchelor (writer) (1775–1838), English farmer, author on dialect and agriculture, and poet
Tommy Batchelor (born 1995), American dancer

See also 
Thomas Batchelor House